Ernst Karl Abbe  (23 January 1840 – 14 January 1905) was a German physicist, optical scientist, entrepreneur, and social reformer. Together with Otto Schott and Carl Zeiss, he developed numerous optical instruments. He was also a co-owner of Carl Zeiss AG, a German manufacturer of scientific microscopes, astronomical telescopes, planetariums, and other advanced optical systems.

Personal life 

Abbe was born 23 January 1840 in Eisenach, Saxe-Weimar-Eisenach, to Georg Adam Abbe and Elisabeth Christina Barchfeldt. He came from a humble home – his father was a foreman in a spinnery. Supported by his father's employer, Abbe was able to attend secondary school and to obtain the general qualification for university entrance with fairly good grades, at the Eisenach Gymnasium, which he graduated from in 1857. By the time he left school, his scientific talent and his strong will had already become obvious. Thus, in spite of the family's strained financial situation, his father decided to support Abbe's studies at the Universities of Jena (1857–1859) and Göttingen (1859–1861). During his time as a student, Abbe gave private lessons to improve his income. His father's employer continued to fund him. Abbe was awarded his PhD in Göttingen on 23 March 1861. While at school, he was influenced by Bernhard Riemann and Wilhelm Eduard Weber, who also happened to be one of the Göttingen Seven. This was followed by two short assignments at the Göttingen observatory and at Physikalischer Verein in Frankfurt (an association of citizens interested in physics and chemistry that was founded by Johann Wolfgang von Goethe in 1824 and still exists today). On 8 August 1863 he qualified as a university lecturer at the University of Jena. In 1870, he accepted a contract as an associate professor of experimental physics, mechanics and mathematics in Jena. In 1871, he married Else Snell, daughter of the mathematician and physicist Karl Snell, one of Abbe's teachers, with whom he had two daughters. He attained full professor status by 1879. He became director of the Jena astronomical and meteorological observatory in 1878. In 1889, he became a member of the Bavarian Academy of Sciences and Humanities. He also was a member of the Saxon Academy of Sciences. He was relieved of his teaching duties at the University of Jena in 1891. Abbe died 14 January 1905 in Jena. He was an atheist.

Life work 

In 1866, he became a research director at the Zeiss Optical Works, and in 1886 he invented the apochromatic lens, a microscope lens which eliminates both the primary and secondary color distortion. By 1870, Abbe invented the Abbe condenser, used for microscope illumination. In 1871, he designed the first refractometer, which he described in a booklet published in 1874.  He developed the laws of image of non-luminous objects by 1872. Zeiss Optical Works began selling his improved microscopes in 1872, by 1877 they were selling microscopes with homogenous immersion objective, and in 1886 his apochromatic objective microscopes were being sold. He created the Abbe number, a measure of any transparent material's variation of refractive index with wavelength and Abbe's criterion, which tests the hypothesis, that a systematic trend exists in a set of observations (in terms of resolving power this criterion stipulates that an angular separation cannot be less than the ratio of the wavelength to the aperture diameter, see angular resolution). Already a professor in Jena, he was hired by Carl Zeiss to improve the manufacturing process of optical instruments, which back then was largely based on trial and error.

Abbe was the first to define the term numerical aperture, as the sine of the half angle multiplied by the refractive index of the medium filling the space between the cover glass and front lens.

Abbe is credited by many for discovering the resolution limit of the microscope, and the formula (published in 1873)

although in a publication in 1874, Helmholtz states this formula was first derived by Joseph Louis Lagrange, who had died 61 years prior. Helmholtz was so impressed as to offer a professorship at the University of Berlin, which he refused due to his ties to Zeiss. Abbe was in the camp of the wide aperturists, arguing that microscopic resolution is ultimately limited by the aperture of the optics, but also argued that depending on application there are other parameters that should be weighted over the aperture in the design of objectives. In Abbe's 1874 paper, titled "A Contribution to the Theory of the Microscope and the nature of Microscopic Vision", Abbe states that the resolution of a microscope is inversely dependent on its aperture, but without proposing a formula for the resolution limit of a microscope.

In 1876, Abbe was offered a partnership by Zeiss and began to share in the considerable profits. In 1878, he built the first homogenous immersion system for the microscope. The objectives that the Abbe Zeiss collaboration were producing were of ideal ray geometry, allowing Abbe to find that the aperture sets the upper limit of microscopic resolution, not the curvature and placement of the lenses. Abbe's first publication of  occurred in 1882. In this publication, Abbe states that both his theoretical and experimental investigations confirmed . Abbe's contemporary Henry Edward Fripp, English translator of Abbe's and Helmholtz's papers, puts their contributions on equal footing. He also perfected the interference method by Fizeau, in 1884. Abbe, Zeiss, Zeiss' son, Roderich Zeiss, and Otto Schott formed, in 1884, the Jenaer Glaswerk Schott & Genossen. This company, which in time would in essence merge with Zeiss Optical Works, was responsible for research and production of 44 initial types of optical glass. Working with telescopes, he built an image reversal system in 1895.

In addition to spherical aberration, Abbe discovered that the rays in optical systems must have constant angular magnification over their angular distribution to produce a diffraction limited spot, a principle known as the Abbe sine condition. So monumental and advanced were Abbe's calculations and achievements that Frits Zernike based his phase contrast work on them, for which he was awarded the Nobel Prize in 1953, and Hans Busch used them to work on the development of the electron microscope.

During his association with Carl Zeiss' microscope works, not only was he at the forefront of the field of optics but also labor reform. He founded the social democratic Jenaische Zeitung (newspaper) in 1890 and in 1900, introduced the eight-hour workday, in remembrance of the 14-hour workday of his own father. In addition, he created a pension fund and a discharge compensation fund. In 1889, Ernst Abbe set up and endowed the Carl Zeiss Foundation for research in science. The aim of the foundation was "to secure the economic, scientific, and technological future and in this way to improve the job security of their employees." He made it a point that the success of an employee was based solely on their ability and performance, not on their origin, religion, or political views. In 1896, he reorganized the Zeiss optical works into a cooperative with profit-sharing. His social views were so respected as to be used by the Prussian state as a model and idealized by Alfred Weber in the 1947 book Schriften der Heidelberger Aktionsgruppe zur Demokratie und Zum Freien Sozialismus.

The crater Abbe on the Moon was named in his honour.

Bibliography
Abbe was a pioneer in optics, lens design, and microscopy, and an authority of his time. He left us with numerous publications of his findings, inventions, and discoveries. Below is a list of publications he authored including many links to the scanned Google Books pages.

See also

Abbe condenser
Abbe diffraction limit
Abbe error
Abbe eyepiece
Abbe number
Abbe prism
Abbe refractometer
Abbe sine condition
Abbe–Koenig prism
Abbe–Porro prism
Aberration in optical systems
Crown glass (optics)
Dermatoscopy
Diaphragm (optics)
Calculation of glass properties
Optical aberration
Optical dilatometer
German inventors and discoverers

Notes

References

Sources

Further reading
 
 Volkmann, Harald. "Ernst Abbe and his work." Applied Optics 5.11 (1966): 1720–1731.

External links

Basic Principles of Refractometers (and Polarimeters) 

Molecular Expressions's biography
 
 
Abbe Refractometer by Carl Zeiss made in 1904
 

1840 births
1905 deaths
German atheists
19th-century German inventors
19th-century German physicists
Optical engineers
History of glass
Glass engineering and science
Glass physics
Microscopists
German scientific instrument makers
Members of the Prussian Academy of Sciences
People from Eisenach
People from Saxe-Weimar-Eisenach
Fellows of the Royal Microscopical Society
University of Göttingen alumni
University of Jena alumni
Academic staff of the University of Jena
Lens designers
Carl Zeiss AG people
Members of the Göttingen Academy of Sciences and Humanities